This is a list of the National Register of Historic Places listings in Bastrop County, Texas.

This is intended to be a complete list of properties and districts listed on the National Register of Historic Places in Bastrop County, Texas. There are five districts, including one National Historic Landmark district, and 95 individual properties listed on the National Register in the county. An additional site was formerly listed. One individually listed property is a State Antiquities Landmark and contains two Recorded Texas Historic Landmarks. Twenty-three other properties and numerous sites within three districts are also Recorded Texas Historic Landmarks.

Current listings

The locations of National Register properties and districts may be seen in a mapping service provided.

|}

Former listing

|}

See also

List of National Historic Landmarks in Texas
National Register of Historic Places listings in Texas
Recorded Texas Historic Landmarks in Bastrop County

References

External links

Bastrop